Marske may refer to:

Places 
 Marske, Richmondshire, a village in North Yorkshire, England
 Marske-by-the-Sea, Redcar and Cleveland, a large village, North Yorkshire, England
 Marske railway station
 New Marske, Redcar and Cleveland, a village south-west of Marske-by-the-Sea

Other uses 
 Marske (horse), a thoroughbred racehorse and sire
 Marske United F.C., an English football club in Marske-by-the-Sea